Fabiane Mayumi Hukuda (born July 12, 1981, in Registro) is a female judoka from Brazil, who twice won the bronze medal in the half lightweight division (– 52 kg) at the Pan American Games (1999 and 2003). A resident of Belo Horizonte, she represented her native country at the 2004 Summer Olympics in Athens, Greece.

References
  Profile

External links
 

1981 births
Living people
Sportspeople from São Paulo (state)
Judoka at the 2004 Summer Olympics
Judoka at the 1999 Pan American Games
Judoka at the 2003 Pan American Games
Olympic judoka of Brazil
Brazilian people of Japanese descent
Brazilian female judoka
Pan American Games bronze medalists for Brazil
Pan American Games medalists in judo
Medalists at the 1999 Pan American Games
Medalists at the 2003 Pan American Games
20th-century Brazilian women
21st-century Brazilian women
People from Registro